Souffleurs De Vers Tour is a live album by the French progressive rock band Ange. It was released in 2009.

Track listing
"Tous Les Boomerangs Du Monde"  – 04:39
"La Gare De Troyes"  – 04:48
"Exode"  – 05:00
"Dieu Est Un Escroc"  – 09:02
"La Bête"  – 08:09
"Aurélia"  – 03:40
"Nouvelles Du Ciel"  – 04:55
"Coupée En Deux"  – 07:04
"Je Travaille Sans Filet"  – 07:20
"Souffleurs De Vers [Le Film]"  – 19:00
DVD:
"Tous Les Boomerangs Du Monde" 
"La Gare De Troyes" 
"Exode" 
"Dieu Est Un Escroc" 
"La Bête" 
"Aurélia" 
"Nouvelles Du Ciel" 
"Coupée En Deux" 
"Je Travaille Sans Filet" 
"Saga" 
"Ode À Émile" 
"Souffleurs De Vers [Synopsis]" 
"Souffleurs De Vers [Le Film]" 
DVD - Bonus Tracks:
"Les Beaux Restes" 
"Saga [Version Longue]" 
"Les Noces" 
"Quasimodo" 
"Galerie Photos"

Personnel
Lead Vocals, Acoustic Guitar, Keyboards, Accordion: Christian Decamps
Vocals, Percussion: Caroline Crozat
Keyboards, Backing Vocals: Tristan Decamps
Guitar, Backing Vocals: Hassan Hajdi
Bass, Backing Vocals: Thierry Sidhoum
Drums, Percussion: Benoît Cazzulini

References
Souffleurs De Vers Tour on ange-updlm 
Souffleurs De Vers Tour on www.amarokprog.net

Ange albums
2009 live albums